Chennai Elevated Expressways is a road network development scheme of the Second Master Plan by CMDA for Chennai city, India.

Corridors 
Five elevated corridors have been proposed as a medium-term scheme.

The following 12 corridors have been proposed in the long term scheme

 * Revised cost during tender process.

Other corridors
Apart from the Master Plan, other corridors are being planned by the Corporation of Chennai, Chennai Port Trust and Ennore Port Trust. The following are the details of these elevated roads.

Project deadline
Ten years from the commencement of the project (January 2009). The corridors are expected to be completed by 2019–2020.

References 

Expressways in Tamil Nadu
Urban transit in Chennai
Urban road transit in Chennai
Proposed roads in India